Siddiq Tawer Kafi (also: Siddig, Tower, Sadeek) is a physicist and member of the Arab Socialist Ba'ath Party – Region of Sudan who was a member of the Sovereignty Council of Sudan from 21 August 2019 to 25 October 2021.

Childhood and education
Tawer's background is in the Nuba Mountains.

Career
Tawer is a physicist who has taught at several Sudanese universities.

Political and human rights activities
Tawer is a member of the Arab Socialist Ba'ath Party – Region of Sudan.

Sovereignty Council
On 21 August 2019, Tawer became one of the civilian members of the joint civilian–military transitionary head of state of Sudan called the Sovereignty Council of Sudan. After his nomination, Tawer's membership of the Ba'ath Party "sparked a debate" according to Asharq al-Awsat, which Tawer attributed to "the state" and to the Sudan People's Liberation Movement.

On 8 November 2019, Tawer confirmed Prime Minister Abdalla Hamdok's earlier statement that former president and International Criminal Court (ICC) indictee Omar al-Bashir would be surrendered to the ICC after the completion of his Sudanese court cases.

References

Arab Socialist Ba'ath Party – Region of Sudan politicians
Date of birth missing (living people)
Living people
Members of the Sovereignty Council of Sudan
Sudanese physicists
Year of birth missing (living people)